Cuchilla Alta (the Spanish term for High Hill) is a seaside resort of the Costa de Oro, in Canelones Department of Uruguay, Montevideo.

Geography

Location

Population
In 2011 Cuchilla Alta had a population of 527 inhabitants.
 
Source: Instituto Nacional de Estadística de Uruguay

Tourism
This tourist complex is noted for its deep beaches. It offers regional tourists an ample range of services with its cabins, motels and commercial facilities.

References

External links
INE map of Biarritz, Cuchilla Alta, El Galeón, Santa Ana and Santa Lucía del Este

Populated places in the Canelones Department
Seaside resorts in Uruguay